The Tembé, also Timbé and Tenetehara, are an indigenous people of Brazil, living along the Maranhão and Gurupi Rivers, in the state of Amazonas and Pará. Their lands have been encroached and settled by farmers and loggers, who do so illegally, and the Tembé are working to expel the intruders from their territories.

Name
The Tembé call themselves Tenetehara, which means "people," or more specifically the Tenetehara people, of which the Tembé are the western subgroup and the Guajarara are the eastern subgroup. "Tembé" is thought to come from a neighboring tribe's word, timbeb, which means "flat nose."

Language
Tembé people speak the Tembé language, a Tupi-Guarani language. It is mutually intelligible with the Guajajára language.

Notes

External links
Tembé headdress, collection of the National Museum of the American Indian

Ethnic groups in Brazil
Indigenous peoples in Brazil
Indigenous peoples of the Amazon